Thawāb/ Sawab/ Suwob is an Arabic term meaning "reward". Specifically, in the context of an Islamic worldview, thawāb refers to spiritual merit or reward that accrues from the performance of good deeds and piety.

Pronunciation 
The word thawāb is used throughout the Islamic world, so the spelling and pronunciation is slightly different from one region to another. In Kazakh society, for instance, it may be pronounced as "sauap", by Bengalis as "suab", in Iran as "savob", in India and Pakistan as "savab". Among Kurds its pronounced "Sewab". In Bosnian and Turkish the word becomes sevap.

Activities for earning thawāb, or a reward 
Usually any and all good acts are considered to contribute towards earning sawāb, but for a Muslim there are certain acts that are more rewarding than others. The primary contributing factor on the extent of the reward is based on one's intention in one's heart – the silent, unspoken one that God is aware of and not the expressed, articulated one. These may be one and the same, but the articulation is not required prior to performing the deed.

The meritorious acts in Islam can be divided into categories – the spiritual good and the moral good. There cannot be moral good without the spiritual good. Or at least the moral good will not have a high bearing if  not accompanied by the spiritual good.

Spiritual good includes the acts of worship including Prayer (obligatory and supererogatory), remembrance of God in the aftermath of the prayer or at any other time, acts of prescribed charity (zakat), reading of the Quran, among others.

The moral good comes from treating parents with love and affection, and not with disdain; visiting sick people, keeping ties of kinship, spending money wisely in charitable causes, giving family their due rights, etc.

The relative merits of each act lies with God alone, and is dependent on such factors as the extent of the level of sacrifice, the difficulty endured (or that one would endure from doing the good), intention for benefits in the hereafter, etc.

See also
 Islamic views on piety
 Punya – Hindu view of Sawāb/Heavenly merit.
 Heavenly Merit – Christian view of sawāb.
 Hasanāt – from Arabic حَسَنَات‎

References 

Arabic words and phrases in Sharia
Islamic terminology
Quran
Sharia legal terminology